Jonas Salley Seawright (born April 12, 1982) is a former American football defensive tackle. He was signed by the New York Giants as an undrafted free agent in 2005. He played college football at North Carolina.

Seawright was also a member of the Dallas Cowboys, New York Sentinels and Hartford Colonials.

Early years
Seawright attended Orangeburg Wilkinson High School in Orangeburg, South Carolina and was a letterman in football. In football, he was a two-year starter, and was an All-State honoree as a senior. As a junior, he posted 175 tackles and 5 sacks.

College career
During his college years, he played for University of North Carolina. During Seawright's freshman season, he played against Clemson, and Maryland.  He was also redshirted in 2000. The following year, Jonas played some time on the offensive line, but soon switched back to DT.  During this season, he appeared in 11 games, and played an extensive amount of time against Wake Forest, where he made 1 tackle. This year, he gained 7 tackles, 2 of which were solo, while 5 were assists.  In a season finale against Duke, Seawright made 3 tackles.  He also 2 tackles from a game against Clemson. Seawright's junior year he played in all 12 games, starting 6 of them, against teams such as Florida State, Syracuse, Wisconsin, Virginia, East Carolina, and Arizona State.  He ended the year having 10 tackles, 5 of which were primary stops, and the other 5 were assists.  This year, Seawright had 3 blocked kicks.  These include a blocked extra point against Florida State, and Arizona State. The other was a blocked field goal in the Wake Forest game.  Seawright also recorded 2 tackles against Syracuse and Duke.

Professional career

New York Giants
Seawright made the 53 man roster in 2006 for the New York Giants and played in nine games, but in 2007 the Giants, with many talented defensive lineman, made the decision to cut him. Jonas Seawright became a fan favorite on the Giants.com message board. While most fans never expected him to make a major impact in the trenches, 'The Legend of Jonas Seawright'thread is one of fond memories for Giants.com message boarders for its witty bon mots, many done in the 'Chuck Norris...' motif.

Dallas Cowboys
Seawright was signed by the Dallas Cowboys on May 18, 2009.

References

External links
North Carolina Tar Heels bio
Just Sports Stats

1982 births
Living people
Players of American football from South Carolina
American football defensive tackles
North Carolina Tar Heels football players
New York Giants players
Dallas Cowboys players
New York Sentinels players
Hartford Colonials players
Sacramento Mountain Lions players
San Antonio Talons players
Orangeburg-Wilkinson High School alumni